Hayden Stephen (born 9 January 1972) is a former athlete from Trinidad and Tobago.

Stephen was a member of Trinidad and Tobago's bronze medal winning 4 × 400 metres relay teams at both the 1994 Commonwealth Games and 1995 Pan American Games.

References

External links
Hayden Stephen at the IAAF

1972 births
Living people
Trinidad and Tobago male sprinters
Commonwealth Games bronze medallists for Trinidad and Tobago
Commonwealth Games medallists in athletics
Athletes (track and field) at the 1994 Commonwealth Games
Athletes (track and field) at the 1995 Pan American Games
Pan American Games bronze medalists for Trinidad and Tobago
Pan American Games medalists in athletics (track and field)
Medalists at the 1995 Pan American Games
Medallists at the 1994 Commonwealth Games